Joseph Reynolds is an American former Negro league pitcher who played in the 1930s.

Reynolds played for the Philadelphia Stars in 1935, and for the Bacharach Giants the following season. In five recorded appearances on the mound, he posted a 6.86 ERA over 21 innings.

References

External links
 and Seamheads

Year of birth missing
Place of birth missing
Bacharach Giants players
Philadelphia Stars players
Baseball pitchers